Eleanor Brooksby was an English noblewoman who, along with her sister Anne Vaux, supported Catholics in England during the 16th century by providing safe houses including Baddesley Clinton in Warwickshire and White Webbs in Enfield Chase near London for Jesuit missionaries such as Henry Garnett.

Life
Brooksby was the eldest daughter and second child of William Vaux, 3rd Baron Vaux of Harrowden, and his first wife, Elizabeth, daughter of John Beaumont of Grace Dieu, Leicester. She married Edward Brokesby, Esq., of Sholdby, Leicester.

In 1605 she and Vaux attended an illegal pilgrimage of Catholic recusants to Holywell. She and her sister completed the journey without shoes.

The pilgrimage was later suspected by authorities of having been used as cover for planning the Gunpowder Plot.

Brooksby's granddaughter Mary Thimelby would become a prioress.

References

Further reading
Hartley, Cathy and Susan Leckey. A Historical Dictionary of British Women. London: Routledge, 2003. 

Year of birth missing
Year of death missing
English criminals
Gunpowder Plot
16th-century English people
17th-century English people
English Roman Catholics
Eleanor
Daughters of barons